Job Prince (1795-1875) was an American politician from Maine. Originally from Buckfield, Maine, Prince served four terms in the Maine Legislature representing Turner, Maine. Each term was elected annually. In 1834, he spent his first and only term in the Maine House of Representatives. Four years later in 1838, Prince was elected to the Maine Senate. Re-elected a year later, Prince was elected Senate President. Prince won his seat again in 1854. In 1860, he joined the Governor's Council.

He served in many local offices in Androscoggin County, including County Commissioner, Judge of Probate and Tax Assessor. A farmer, Prince served as President of the Oxford County Agricultural Society as well.

References

1795 births
1875 deaths
People from Turner, Maine
People from Buckfield, Maine
County commissioners in Maine
Members of the Maine House of Representatives
Presidents of the Maine Senate
Farmers from Maine
19th-century American politicians